Virginia's 38th Senate district is one of 40 districts in the Senate of Virginia. It has been represented by Republican Travis Hackworth since 2021, following the death of fellow Republican A. Benton Chafin from complications of COVID-19.

Geography
District 38 is based in Southwest Virginia, including all of Bland, Buchanan, Dickenson, Pulaski, Russell, and Tazewell Counties and the cities of Norton and Radford, as well as parts of Montgomery, Smyth, and Wise Counties.

The district is located entirely within Virginia's 9th congressional district, and overlaps with the 1st, 3rd, 4th, 6th, 7th, and 12th districts of the Virginia House of Delegates. It borders the states of West Virginia and Kentucky.

Recent election results

2021 special

2019

2015

2014 special

2011

Federal and statewide results in District 38

Historical results
All election results below took place prior to 2011 redistricting, and thus were under different district lines.

2007

2003

1999

1998 special

1995

References

Virginia Senate districts
Bland County, Virginia
Buchanan County, Virginia
Dickenson County, Virginia
Pulaski County, Virginia
Russell County, Virginia
Tazewell County, Virginia
Norton, Virginia
Radford, Virginia
Smyth County, Virginia
Wise County, Virginia
Montgomery County, Virginia